Shuna (Gaelic Siuna) is one of the Slate Islands lying east of Luing on the west coast of Scotland.

History
In 1815, James Yates, a Glasgow native living in Woodville in Devon, bought the island from Colonel McDonald of Lynedale. In 1829 Yates bequeathed the island in trust to the magistrates and council of Glasgow, with profits from the estate divide two fifths to the city, two fifths to Glasgow University and one fifth to Glasgow Royal Infirmary. This was disputed by Yates' heir, who accepted £300 from the trustees to settle his claim. The revenue from the island was scarce and the trustees sold it in 1911.

Shuna Castle was built as recently as 1911. It fell into disrepair in the 1980s when the cost of maintenance become too great.

Unlike the other Slate Islands, Shuna has little slate, and has historically been farmed, although it is now overgrown with woodland. There are several cairns in the south and west of the small island.

During the nineteenth century the population numbered up to 69, but by the 2001 census, Shuna was one of four Scottish islands with a population of one. The island has been privately owned by the Gully family since 1946. It is now occupied by a farmer and his family, who let four houses as holiday cottages and had a usually resident population of 3 in 2011.

Wildlife
The island has healthy populations of red, roe and fallow deer; along with otters, common and grey seals, porpoises and dolphins out on the water.

References

External links
Island website

Slate Islands
Islands of Argyll and Bute
Private islands of the United Kingdom